Mrs. Munck is a 1995 American comedy film written and directed by Diane Ladd. It is based on the 1970 novel Mrs. Munck by Ella Leffland. The film stars Diane Ladd, Bruce Dern, Kelly Preston, Shelley Winters, Jim Walton and Scott Fisher. The film premiered on Showtime on January 28, 1996.

Plot
A widow exacts revenge on her wheelchair-using father-in-law for an affair they had in her youth.

Cast 
Diane Ladd as Rose Munck
Bruce Dern as Patrick Leary
Kelly Preston as Young Rose Munck
Shelley Winters as Aunt Monica
Jim Walton as Harley
Scott Fisher as Felix
Vinnie Sciullo as Marino
Chris Leavens as Steve
Seymour Cassel as Gem
Bernard Arene as Maitre / Waiter
Phallon Carpino as Two Year Old Daughter
Travis Kyle Davis as Boy
Steve Bulen as Quigley

Soundtrack
The film's theme song, "Not A Day Goes By", was written by Carol Connors and Steve Plunkett, and performed by David Hasselhoff.

References

External links
 

1995 films
American comedy films
1995 comedy films
1995 directorial debut films
1990s English-language films
1990s American films